John Leslie (3 November 1814 – 4 November 1897) was an Irish first-class cricketer and barrister.

A younger son of John Leslie senior, Bishop of Kilmore, Elphin and Ardagh and Isabella St. Lawrence  he was born at Dromore in November 1814. He was educated in England at Harrow School, before matriculating at Christ Church, Oxford in 1833. While studying at Oxford, he played first-class cricket on two occasions in 1836. The first of these came for the Marylebone Cricket Club (MCC) against Oxford University at Oxford, while the second match came for Oxford University against the MCC at Lord's. A student of both King's Inns in Dublin and of Lincoln's Inn, he was called to the bar in 1840 and January 1841 respectively. He was latterly a member of the Middle Temple. Leslie died a day after his 83rd birthday in November 1897 at Albury, Surrey.

References

External links

1814 births
1897 deaths
Sportspeople from County Down
People educated at Harrow School
Alumni of Christ Church, Oxford
Irish cricketers
Cricketers from Northern Ireland
Marylebone Cricket Club cricketers
Oxford University cricketers
Irish barristers
Alumni of King's Inns
Members of the Middle Temple